Francesco Sarcina (born 30 October 1976) is an Italian singer-songwriter, best known for being the frontman of rock band Le Vibrazioni.

Besides his activity with Le Vibrazioni, he started a solo career in 2013 with the single "Tutta la notte". He released two studio albums, Io (2014) and Femmina (2015). Sarcina participated at the Sanremo Music Festival four times as a member of Le Vibrazioni (2005, 2018, 2020, 2022) and one time as a solo artist in 2014, with the song "Nel tuo sorriso".

Discography

Solo 
Io (2014)
Femmina (2015)

With Le Vibrazioni

References 

1976 births
Living people
Musicians from Milan
Italian singer-songwriters